49th Division or 49th Infantry Division may refer to:

Infantry divisions:
 49th Division (1st Formation)(People's Republic of China), 1949–1950
 49th Reserve Division (German Empire)
 49th Infantry Division Parma (Kingdom of Italy)
 49th Division (Imperial Japanese Army), Japanese Burma Area Army
 49th Rifle Division (RSFSR)
 49th Guards Rifle Division (Soviet Union)
 49th Rifle Division (Soviet Union)
 49th (West Riding) Infantry Division (United Kingdom)
 49th Infantry Division (United States)
 49th Infantry Division (Wehrmacht) (Germany)

Armoured divisions:
 49th Armored Division (United States)

See also
 49th Brigade (disambiguation)
 49th Regiment (disambiguation)
 49th Squadron (disambiguation)